The Yamaha XT 600 is a motorcycle manufactured by Japanese motorcycle manufacturer Yamaha.  It was built from 1984 to 2003 in different versions.

Model history 
The XT 600 is considered to be an all-purpose Enduro, which is suitable for use on the road as well as off-road driving. Its disc brakes, four-valve engine, mono-shock absorber (mono Cross) and contemporary 12-volt electrics represented significant improvements over the 1975 model Yamaha XT 500.

The first XT 600 was introduced in June 1983, the XT 600ZL Ténéré [34L] based on the XT 550 engine, kick start only, with the 30-Litre white tank. In 1984 the basic XT 600 was introduced to "replace" the XT 550. In addition to the changes in design, the main difference was an 11.5-litre tank instead of the 30-litre long-range 600ZL Ténéré's tank; the road model Yamaha SRX was derived later. In 1991, the somewhat obsolete XTZ 600 Ténéré was replaced by the water-cooled, five-valve Yamaha XTZ 660, which did not manage to carry over the legendary reputation of its air-cooled predecessors.

Over the years, the XT was built in 600 different variants which, however, usually only look different. The most important change of the XT 600 which had only been using a kick start was in 1990; the XT 600 E was presented as a new model with a more contemporary design, chrome-plated steel wheel instead of aluminum wheels, now without a tachometer, with the exhaust as the supporting frame member, a 13.9-litre tank and an electric starter. In addition, the oil tank, which was previously located under the left side cover, was moved forward behind the steering head between the frame and girder bridge. Due to high demand, the XT 600 K, which featured a kick-starter, but was otherwise structurally identical to the XT 600 E model, was introduced to the market; the series ran until 1995. The clutch actuation on the engine body was moved from the left to the right side, and the muffler was no longer part of the rear frame. The reliability of the XT unit was not harmed, as mileages of over 100,000 km and unopened motor are not uncommon.

The bike was eventually succeeded by several newer versions including XT660R (road-trail), XT660X (motard), and XT660Z Ténéré (adventure). 
Additionally, it inspired larger models, notably the adventure-styled XTZ750 Super Ténéré and XT1200Z Super Ténéré.

Points of interest: The 600ZL was known as this because it was a 600Z 34L. However this trend did not continue with the following 55W model in 1984/5, or it could have been known as 600ZW. The easiest way to distinguish a 34L from the near-identical (but in many small ways superior) 55W is that the latter has sloping speed blocks on the tank.

Technical data 
 Type: 3UW Year 94
 Empty weight: 163 kg (type 2KF, built in 1987 and 1989 for 153 kg)
 Fork diameter 41 mm, 255 mm of travel front, 225 mm rear (type 2KF 235 mm rear)
 Air-cooled four-stroke engine 4-valve
 one cylinder, arranged vertically
 Bore: 95 mm
 Stroke: 84 mm
 Displacement: 595 cm ³
 Compression ratio: 8.5:1
 Maximum speed: 141–155 km / h (depending on model)
 Power: 27-46 hp (depending on restriction)
 Chain drive
 Seat height

Models

Literature 
 Bucheli Publisher: Yamaha XT 600 Tenere / XT 600 from year 1983: Manual for care, maintenance and repair 
 Bucheli Publisher: Yamaha XT 600 E from 1990, 
 Yamaha Motor Co Ltd, 1st edition Apr 1983: Yamaha ZT600ZL Supplementary Service Manual serial# from 39E000101 Manual# 39E-28197-60
 Yamaha Motor Co Ltd, 1st edition Dec 1983: Yamaha ZT600ZL Supplementary Service Manual serial# from 39E004101 Manual# 53R-28197-20

References

External links 

 Yamaha’s Ténéré travel bikes
 German pages covering the air-cooled Ténérés
 XT600 retrospective by US Rider magazine

XT600
Yamaha XT600